James Andrew Clarkson (7 February 1906 – 6 June 1970) was an American mathematician and professor of mathematics who specialized in number theory. His proofs are known in mathematics as Clarkson's inequalities. He was an operations' analyst during World War II, and was awarded the Medal of Freedom for his achievements. He wrote First reader on game theory, and many of his academic papers have been published in several scientific journals. He was an invited speaker at the 1932 International Congress of Mathematicians (ICM) in Zürich.

Life
Originally from Massachusetts, in 1934 he received the Ph.D. in Mathematics from Brown University, with the dissertation entitled On Definitions of Bounded Variation for Functions of Two Variables, On Double Riemann–Stieltjes Integrals under the supervision of advisor Clarence Raymond Adams.

In 1943, he was assigned as a bombing analyst at the Bombing Accuracy Subsection of the Operational Research Section (ORS) at the Headquarters Eighth Air Force division of the United States Air Force, alongside other mathematicians like Frank M. Stewart, J. W. T. Youngs, Ray E. Gilman, and W. J. Youden. He later received the Medal of Freedom.

From 1940 to 1948 he held a tenured appointment in the Department of Mathematics in the University of Pennsylvania and then from 1949 to 1970 he held a professorship at Tufts University.

Most of his academic papers and contributions have been published by the American Mathematical Society, and Duke Mathematical Journal.

Academic papers

References

1970 deaths
20th-century American mathematicians
Number theorists
People from Massachusetts
Brown University alumni
Tufts University faculty
1906 births